The Fifth Third Center in Nashville, Tennessee, is a 31-story,  skyscraper. It was constructed in 1986 and is located on Church Street and Fifth Avenue North. It was the tallest building in both Nashville and Tennessee for eight years, until it was surpassed by the AT&T Building in 1994.  It serves as the home to Fifth Third Bank's  Nashville headquarters.

History
The tower was designed as the Third National Corporation headquarters, and originally called Third National Financial Center.  After the acquisition of Third National by SunTrust, the tower became known as SunTrust Center until 2004, when the naming rights were given up due to SunTrust's plans to move to the upcoming SunTrust Plaza.

This site was also home to the First Masonic Hall, designed in 1818.  The structure burned in 1856, and was also rebuilt as a Masonic Hall, which was used during the American Civil War as a hospital supply store by Federal troops.  This new structure also included a theater known as "the Masonic" and "the Grand".  The Masonic/Grand Theater was vacated for theatrical purposes in 1914 and the property was sold in 1915 to Joe Fensterwald, who demolished it and erected the steel and concrete building that was to house Burk and Company.

See also
List of tallest buildings in Nashville

References

External links
 Official Site

Skyscraper office buildings in Nashville, Tennessee

Kohn Pedersen Fox buildings
Office buildings completed in 1986